Manglerud Star Ishockey are a Norwegian ice hockey club based in Oslo. They are members of the highest Norwegian ice hockey league, Eliteserien (known as GET-ligaen for sponsorship reasons). Manglerud Star Ishockey are the ice hockey department of IL Manglerud Star, a sports club founded in 1913. Originally known as Star, the club became known as Manglerud/Star after merging with Manglerud IL in 1964, and eventually Manglerud Star (without the slash). Ice hockey was included as an activity in 1967, and is today one of two sports practised by the club, the other being football. As of 2010, they have completed twenty-nine seasons in the Eliteserien and have won 385 regular season games.

Manglerud Star achieved success in the early years of their existence thanks to a selection of talented young players who, after winning several youth and junior championships, brought the club into the highest division ahead of the 1973–74 season. From then on and until the early 1980s, the club fought regularly for the League Championship, finishing the season as runners-up five times in a row from 1975 to 1979. In the playoffs, they were increasingly successful until finally winning back-to-back Norwegian Championship titles in 1977 and 1978. After losing in the Finals against Vålerengen in 1982, a long period of decline ensued, culminating in relegation to the second level in the 1990–91 season. Having returned to the Eliteserien in 1993, Manglerud Star collaborated with Furuset and a group of investors to form the Spektrum Flyers franchise in 1994. When this effort collapsed after only two seasons, Manglerud Star chose to again compete as a team in their own right.

Seasons

Notes
Code explanation; GP—Games Played, W—Wins, L—Losses, T—Tied games, OTW—Overtime/Shootout wins, OTL—Overtime/Shootout losses, GF—Goals For, GA—Goals Against, Pts—Points
Manglerud Star tied first with Skiold after four games, winning the replay 6–5 to claim the 3. divisjon Championship title and win promotion to the 2. divisjon.
In the 1972–73 season, an elaborate system of qualifying rounds was used to expand the number of teams in the 1. divisjon from eight to ten. Manglerud Star placed second in the first round for 2. divisjon teams and were thus promoted to the 1. divisjon without further competition.
Mellomspillet was a one-time continuation league contested in 1984–85 between the six highest ranked teams in the 1. divisjon. Of these six teams, the top four qualified for the Semi-finals of the Norwegian Championship.
Before the 1990–91 season, the 1. divisjon was renamed Eliteserien. Correspondingly, the 2. divisjon (second tier) was renamed 1. divisjon, the 3. divisjon (third tier) was renamed 2. divisjon etc.
Between the 1990–91 season and the 1993–94 season, the Eliteserien was divided into two parts. After the first 18 games, the top eight teams qualified for the second half of the Eliteserien. The bottom two teams were relegated to the 1. divisjon and would compete for the right to play in the Eliteserien in the following season. In 1990–91, the results of both rounds were added up to produce one league champion; in the three following seasons, there were two champions per season.
Beginning with the 2002–03 season, all games in the Eliteserien have a winner. In addition, teams now receive three points for a win in regulation time, two points for a win in overtime and one point for a loss in overtime.
Totals as of the completion of the 2009–10 season.

References

Manglerud Star Ishockey seasons, List of
Seasons